Kuzmino is a rural locality (a village) in Sudislavsky District, Kostroma Oblast, Russia. Population:

References 

Rural localities in Kostroma Oblast
Populated places in Sudislavsky District